Astragalus cerasocrenus is a species of milkvetch in the family Fabaceae.

This species can be recognized by a small crown of flowers near the top of the stem.

References
http://ceiba.biosci.arizona.edu/astragalus/images/Astragalus_images/Acerasocrenus.htm

cerasocrenus
Taxa named by Alexander von Bunge